Sinclair Matthew Skinner (born May 31, 1969) is an American engineer, human rights activist, political adviser, serial entrepreneur and former elected official in Washington, D.C.  He is a Bitcoin and Blockchain Technology evangelist and an advocate of the advancement of African communities in relation to the African Diaspora.  He holds a B.S. degree in Mechanical Engineering from Howard University and is a member of Kappa Alpha Psi fraternity. Skinner was first elected to public office in 1998 as an Advisory Neighborhood Commissioner in Washington, D.C.’s Ward 1 neighborhood.

He is currently the co-founder and CEO of Pan African Bitcoin startup Bitmari.

Early life 
Born 1969 in Great Falls Montana and raised by his father, a US Air Force officer, and his mother, a dedicated housewife.

In 1987 he enrolled in Alabama’s Tuskegee University, he was eventually elected President of the University’s Student Government Association.

In 1993 the Skinner led a student protest of the “oppressive and misguided policies common at Historically Black Colleges and Universities (HBCU’s)”,  and organized African-Americans throughout the south in HBCU preservation efforts and demonstrations. Skinner's campus activism would force him to leave Tuskegee University and transfer to Howard University to continue his goal of becoming an engineer.

Activism 
In the summer of 1995 while at Howard, Skinner helped organize students nationally for the Million Man March, the largest all male march ever held in the United States with an estimated million African-American men in attendance.  While at Howard, Skinner and Nik Eames worked with civil-rights giant Lawrence Guyot, who encouraged them to get involved in local politics in Washington, DC, ultimately leading them to run and win positions as advisory neighborhood commissioners—while still students.

After graduating from Howard University, Skinner purchased a former crack house across the street from Howard, and organized his neighbors to help eliminate drug trafficking on the block.

In 1999, Skinner opened the Georgia Avenue Kleaners which eventually grew to a chain of four locations. The dry-cleaners was not a financial success, but Skinner's success and reputation as a philanthropist grew within the Washington, DC African-American community.

In 2005, Skinner led a group of Howard University students and area residents in an effort to paint over gang-related graffiti in the neighborhood with a mural depicting Black historical leaders on a Howard University-owned wall near Howard's Georgia Avenue campus.  The wall–which several university students and residents had complained about for years–took two weeks to paint.  However, the university ordered the painting be removed after newer residents of the neighborhood complained.  Skinner and the students were outraged that residents did not actively pursue the removal of the graffiti, but removed the image of Black leaders and positive families from this wall.

Skinner's Georgia Avenue organizing experience culminated when residents of D.C.’s wards 1 and 4 joined forces to reject the relocation of the Government of the District of Columbia's Department of Motor Vehicles to the intersection of Georgia Avenue and New Hampshire Avenue, just blocks from Skinner's home and dry-cleaners.

The effort forced the creation of the Georgia Avenue Steering committee which led to the smart development framework that influenced the Planned Unit Development, up-zoning and over $100M in neighborhood oriented, mixed-use developments that exists at this intersection currently.

In early 2005, Skinner accused D.C. City councilman of driving historically African-American businesses from the neighborhoods of Columbia Heights, Shaw, and the U Street corridor.

In 2009, Skinner led a group of Washington, DC activists in the donation of a retired District of Columbia fire truck and ambulance to the poverty stricken town of Sosua, Dominican Republic.  However, political pressure surrounding then D.C. Mayor Adrian M. Fenty, and public backlash halted the transaction. The vehicles made it to Miami, but were ultimately returned and auctioned off as scrap metal.

In early 2011, Skinner called for an investigation into D.C. Councilman Jim Graham’s involvement in a bribery scandal involving his chief of staff, Ted Loza.  Loza, who had been Graham's main confidant in the Council office and who month's earlier was arrested by the FBI, had just pleaded guilty to two counts of accepting bribes.  The indictment that was handed down charged that Loza had accepted cash payments in exchange for promoting legislation concerning D.C. taxi cabs  until 2010 when Loza was arrested and Councilman Graham was stripped of his chairmanship, Graham had served as Chairman of the council's committee that oversees taxi cab regulation.

Engineering 
Skinner has worked for numerous engineering companies including Ohmeda, Inc., Honeywell, Pillsbury, McDonnell Douglas Corporation and The Architect of the Capitol where he performed testing and development for the Space Shuttle’s main engine controllers, manufacturing for a flour mill company and designed roadways in Macon County, Alabama where he was an apprentice to Curtis Pierce, the first African American county engineer in Macon County, Alabama.  Skinner later became the first African American student named to the National Board of the American Society of Mechanical Engineers.

After completing his B.S. in mechanical engineering, Skinner worked in product development for Ohmeda, Inc., an international engineering company that designed incubators for premature babies.

Later, Skinner worked for the U.S. Patent and Trademark Office, and received his Engineer in Training certification in 1998. In 2007, Skinner founded Liberty Engineering and Design (LEAD), one of the few black owned engineering firms in Washington, D.C.

Politics 
In 1996, Skinner was the campaign manager for D.C. city council candidate Nik Eames of the “Umoja” political party. Eames became the first member of his party to get ballot representation for city council in Ward 1 of Washington, D.C.

Skinner's success organizing residents of his Georgia Avenue neighborhood in Washington, D.C. would lead to his election to the Advisory Neighborhood Commission as commissioner of jurisdiction 1B09 in 1998.

Later, Skinner would become the director of the Lower Georgia Avenue Business Association. Skinner also became publisher of The Georgia Ave Defender Newsletter, and founder of the Nile Valley Business Corridor Association–an organization that organized neighbors to “fight crime and take back their streets”.

In 2000, Skinner served as a senior campaign adviser to D.C. City Council candidate Adrian M. Fenty. Drawing from his years of experience in organizing, Skinner helped pave the way for Fenty to become the youngest member of D.C. City Council.

In 2006, Skinner helped Fenty coordinate a successful run for Mayor of Washington, D.C.

In 2012 Skinner served as Treasurer and primary donor to the super-PAC 1911 United. Backed by members of Kappa Alpha Psi and Omega Psi Phi, historically black fraternities,  1911 United aimed to raise $1.5 million toward training and organizing  African-American voters in key battleground states to re-elect President Barack Obama. 1911 United also became the first super-PAC to accept bitcoins for contributions.

D.C. City Council investigation 

In December 2009, Skinner was interviewed by the D.C. City Council as part of an investigation into the transfer of funds between District government agencies and his firm's subsequent award of an engineering sub-contract as part of an effort to build and renovate a dozen recreation centers, parks and public fields in the District.

The D.C. Council appointed a special Counsel to look into the transfer of funds between the government agencies as well as the contract that Skinner's company was awarded by the program management firm overseeing the contracts.

In 2011 Skinner held a news conference at the Wilson Building to share that the council's investigation into park contracts had "vindicated" him of any wrongdoing.

Bitcoin 
In 2015 Skinner co-founded BitMari, a Pan-African bitcoin-based financial solutions start-up, with Christopher Mapondera. Using BitMari's wallet, users can make mobile transactions across the African Diaspora using funds in the form of bitcoin.

In October 2016, Ebony Magazine reported that Skinner intends for BitMari to be a catalyst for financial empowerment in the global Black community.  In that same interview he stated, “We think technology is a better method of solving problems than politics and a lot of these other things that we’re trying.”

References

External links 
 Official Website
 BitMari

People from Washington, D.C.
American political consultants
1969 births
Living people